Brand New Day is the eleventh album by Canadian hip hop group Swollen Members. The album was released on June 17, 2014, by Battle Axe Records.

Critical response

Upon its release Brand New Day was met with generally positive reviews from music critics. Rob Boffard Exclaim! gave the album a seven out of ten, saying "It's the individual bright spots that salvage Brand New Day, if only just. The dark imagery Swollen Members specialized in was growing tired; it was a problem on their last two albums and, to some extent, it's a problem on this one. But consider this album as step towards something bigger, and it will all make a crazy kind of sense. Welcome back, boys." Omar Burgess of HipHopDX gave the album three out of five stars, saying "Some 15 years into their careers, it's hard to fault Swollen Members for experimenting—especially when they successfully push beyond their comfort zone. Brand New Day provides a somewhat unbalanced but ultimately pleasing mix of their signature stylings with enough experimentation to both keep things interesting and possibly hint at what's next for the group." Steve Juon of RapReviews gave the album seven out of ten, saying "After twenty years of working together and 15 years of major label distribution, they have nailed down a trademark sound to the point an album like Brand New Day is as excellent as it is par for the course. The difference for newcomers to the group will be Madchild's distinctive nasally voice - you hate it or you love it. From this writer's vantage point S.M. just wouldn't work without it."

Track listing

Charts

References

2014 albums
Swollen Members albums